The Ulken Kundyzdy is a river in the Sarybel and Nura districts, Karaganda Region, Kazakhstan.

The Ulken Kundyzdy river is one the main tributaries of the Nura. It freezes between November and April.

Course 
The Ulken Kundyzdy has its sources in the Kazakh Uplands, a little to the north of Kunduzdy village, northwest of Temirtau. It originates on the southern slopes of Mount Koyandy and flows roughly southwestwards and westwards along its course. Finally it reaches the Nura and enters it from the right bank near Nura village (formerly Kievka), the district capital. 

The Ulken Kundyzdy is fed mainly by precipitation and groundwater. Its valley is wide and there are many stretches with rocky banks. The river meanders in its middle and lower course. Its main tributaries are the Yeltok, Topan and Sabyrkozha.

Fauna
Some of the fish species found in the Ulken Kundyzdy include crucian carp, perch and gudgeon.

See also
List of rivers of Kazakhstan

References

External links
Nura (Kievka), Karaganda Region, Kazakhstan
Реки Казахстана

Rivers of Kazakhstan
Karaganda Region
Tengiz basin